The International Area Studies Review is a peer-reviewed academic journal published by SAGE Publications on behalf of the Center for International Area Studies (Hankuk University of Foreign Studies) and the Peace Research Institute Oslo. It covers all aspects of international area studies. The editor-in-chief is Scott Gates (Peace Research Institute Oslo). It was established in 1997 and is published by SAGE Publications.

Abstracting and indexing 
The journal is abstracted and indexed in EBSCOhost, ProQuest, and Scopus.

External links 
 

SAGE Publishing academic journals
English-language journals
Political science journals
Publications established in 1997
Area studies journals
Quarterly journals